The Council of Ministers of Bosnia and Herzegovina (Bosnian/Croatian: Vijeće ministara Bosne i Hercegovine), often called Bosnian Government, is the executive branch of the government of Bosnia and Herzegovina. It is also called the Cabinet.

According to the Article V, Section 4 of the Constitution of Bosnia and Herzegovina, the Chairman of the Council of Ministers is nominated by the Presidency of Bosnia and Herzegovina and confirmed by the National House of Representatives. The Chairman then appoints other ministers.

Decision of the Constitutional Court
On 11 February 1999, Mirko Banjac, at the time Deputy Chair of the House of Representatives of Bosnia and Herzegovina, instituted a request for, among other issues, the evaluation of the constitutionality of the Law on the Council of Ministers of Bosnia and Herzegovina and the Ministries of Bosnia and Herzegovina (Official Gazette of Bosnia and Herzegovina, No. 4/97) which foresaw the existence of two Co-Chairs and a Vice-Chair of the Council of Ministers. In its decision the Court had, among other things, stated the following:

The Court gave the Parliamentary Assembly of Bosnia and Herzegovina a three-month period from the date of publication of its decision on this matter in the "Official Gazette of Bosnia and Herzegovina" to bring the contested provisions of the Law in conformity with the Constitution of Bosnia and Herzegovina. After the Parliamentary Assembly failed to do that, the Court, acting upon the request of the applicant and pursuant to its decision of 14 August 1999 and the legal standpoint exemplified in the reasons of the decision, established that certain provisions of the Law on Ministers and Ministries shall cease to be valid.

Responsibilities

The Council is responsible for carrying out the policies and decisions in the fields of:
foreign policy
foreign trade policy
customs policy
monetary policy
finances of the institutions and for the international obligations of Bosnia and Herzegovina
immigration, refugee, and asylum policy and regulation
international and inter-Entity criminal law enforcement, including relations with Interpol
establishment and operation of common and international communications facilities
regulation of inter-Entity transportation
air traffic control
facilitation of inter-Entity coordination
other matters as agreed by the Entities

Standing Bodies  of Council of Ministers of Bosnia and Herzegovina
General Secretariat
Economic Directorate
Internal Politics Directorate
Directorate for European Integration of Bosnia and Herzegovina
Bureau for Legal Matters

Current Cabinet

See also
Chairman of the Council of Ministers of Bosnia and Herzegovina
Presidency of Bosnia and Herzegovina
List of Bosniak members of the Presidency of Bosnia and Herzegovina
List of Croat members of the Presidency of Bosnia and Herzegovina
List of Serb members of the Presidency of Bosnia and Herzegovina
List of members of the Presidency of Bosnia and Herzegovina by time in office

References

External links
Website of the Council of Ministers

Politics of Bosnia and Herzegovina
Political organizations based in Bosnia and Herzegovina
Government of Bosnia and Herzegovina
Bosnia and Herzegovina, Council of Ministers
Main
European governments